is a 2014 Japanese sports drama film directed by Masaharu Take and starring Sakura Ando. The film was released in Japan on December 20, 2014. It was selected as the Japanese entry for the Best Foreign Language Film at the 88th Academy Awards but it was not nominated.

Cast
Sakura Ando as Ichiko Saito 
Hirofumi Arai as Yuji Kano   
 as Keiko
 as Fumiko
 as Okano
 as Noma
Hiroki Okita as Sada
 as Takao
 as Kinoshita
Toshie Negishi as Ikeuchi
Ako Masuki

Reception
On Film Business Asia, Derek Elley gave the film a 7 out of 10, calling it "a quirky tale of a social misfit's transformation". Stephen Dalton of The Hollywood Reporter called the film "a powerful portrait of punch-drunk love."

The film won the Japanese Cinema Splash Award at the 27th Tokyo International Film Festival. It was in competition at the 15th Japanese Film Festival Nippon Connection for the Nippon Connection Award and was chosen for third place in the Nippon Cinema Award. At the 88th Kinema Junpo Awards, the film was chosen as the 8th best Japanese film of the year and Sakura Ando won the Award for Best Actress. At the 57th Blue Ribbon Awards, Sakura Ando won the Award for Best Actress. At the 24th Japan Film Professional Awards, the film won the Award for Best Film and Masaharu Take won the Award for Best Director.
The film’s North American Premiere was presented by North America's largest festival of Japanese cinema, Japan Cuts on July 16, 2015

See also
 List of submissions to the 88th Academy Awards for Best Foreign Language Film
 List of Japanese submissions for the Academy Award for Best Foreign Language Film

References

External links

2010s sports drama films
Japanese boxing films
Japanese sports drama films
2014 drama films
2010s Japanese films